Neotoxoscelus is a genus of beetles in the family Buprestidae, containing the following species:

 Neotoxoscelus aeneiventris Fisher, 1930
 Neotoxoscelus bakeri Fisher, 1921
 Neotoxoscelus corporaali Obenberger, 1922
 Neotoxoscelus kerzhneri (Alexeev, 1975)
 Neotoxoscelus kurosawai (Hattori, 1990)
 Neotoxoscelus luzonicus Fisher, 1921
 Neotoxoscelus ornatus Fisher, 1930
 Neotoxoscelus shirahatai (Kurosawa, 1977)

References

Buprestidae genera